Maria Kirilenko was the defending champion but lost in the semifinals against Kimiko Date-Krumm.Kimiko Date-Krumm won in the final 6–3, 6–3 against Anabel Medina Garrigues.

Seeds

Draw

Finals

Top half

Bottom half

External links
Main draw
Qualifying draw

Korea Open (tennis)
Hansol Korea Open